Glinski, Glinskii, Glinsky, or Glinskiy, is a family name. Feminine form: Russian: Glinskaya (Глинская), Polish: Glińska.  It is shared by the following people:
Anna Glinskaya (died 1553), Russian noble, mother of Elena Glinskaya
Elena Glinskaya (c. 1510–1538), Russian regent, daughter of Anna Glinskaya 
Michael Glinski (died 1534), uncle of Tsar Ivan the Terrible
Antoni Józef Gliński (1817–1866), Polish folklorist interred at the Rasos Cemetery
Mikhail Iosifovich Glinsky (1901–1991), Soviet Union general
Frank J. Glinski (1909–1983), New York politician
Wieńczysław Gliński (1921–2008), Polish actor
Juozas Glinskis (born 1933), Lithuanian playwright
Albert Glinsky (born 1952), United States composer & author. His book Theremin: Ether Music and Espionage (2001 Award) is regarded as the Leon Theremin life standard work.
Piotr Gliński (born 1954), Polish sociologist
Nicolas Glinsky (born 1992), French chemist
Robert Gliński (born 1952), Polish film director
Vladislav Glinskiy (born 2000), Belarusian footballer
Władysław Gliński, the inventor of Gliński's hexagonal chess

See also
Gliński coat of arms
Hlynsk, Romny Raion